Ripalta Guerina is a comune (municipality) in the Province of Cremona in the Italian region Lombardy, located about  southeast of Milan and about  northwest of Cremona.

Ripalta Guerina borders the following municipalities: Montodine, Moscazzano, Ripalta Arpina, Ripalta Cremasca.

References

Cities and towns in Lombardy